ArrowLine Chinese Radio, AM 1269 (Chinese name: 南非華夏之聲廣播電台), is a Chinese radio station based in Johannesburg, South Africa.  It currently broadcasts in the Greater Gauteng area, with plans for expansion in the near future. It was established in 2011 and broadcasts from 6AM-10PM, 7 days a week. Previously, ArrowLine Chinese Radio Station of South Africa, originally named "Mandarin Chinese Radio", was a radio station started in 1995 by members of the Chinese community residing in Johannesburg.

External links

Chinese-South African culture
Radio stations in Johannesburg
Chinese-language mass media by country